Truskaw  is a village in the administrative district of Gmina Izabelin, within Warsaw West County, Masovian Voivodeship, in east-central Poland.

The village has a population of 1,400.

References

Truskaw